The Panther! is an album by saxophonist Dexter Gordon that was recorded in 1970 and released on the Prestige label.

Reception

Lindsay Planer of Allmusic states, "Dexter Gordon (tenor sax) entered the 1970s -- as well as his career's quarter-century mark -- on a definite upstroke with the sly, sexy -- and above else -- stylish platter The Panther!"

Track listing 
All compositions by Dexter Gordon except as indicated
 "The Panther" - 6:29     
 "Body and Soul" (Frank Eyton, Johnny Green, Edward Heyman, Robert Sour) - 11:01     
 "Valse Robin" - 5:56     
 "Mrs. Miniver" - 7:38     
 "The Christmas Song" (Mel Tormé, Robert Wells) - 5:23     
 "The Blues Walk" (Clifford Brown) - 7:21

Personnel 
Dexter Gordon - tenor saxophone
Tommy Flanagan - piano
Larry Ridley - bass
Alan Dawson - drums

References 

Dexter Gordon albums
1970 albums
Prestige Records albums
Albums produced by Don Schlitten